The Council of Ministers of Togo consists of members appointed by the President with the advice of the Prime Minister.

The Council of Ministers is chaired by the Prime Minister and is tasked with managing government operations.

Members of the Council of Ministers
On 1 October 2020 the government was announced as follows:

References

Government of Togo
Main
Togo